María Paredes (sometimes credited as Maruja Paredes) was a Spanish film editor active from the 1930s through the 1950s.

Selected filmography 
 I'm Not Mata Hari (1950)
 Audiencia pública (1946)
 El huésped del sevillano (1940)
 Nuestro culpable (1938)

References

External links 
 

Spanish women film editors
Spanish film editors